Phrynichus (Ancient Greek: Φρύνιχος; died 411 BC) was an Athenian general (strategos) during the Peloponnesian War (431–404 BC), who supported the Athenian coup of 411 BC which briefly replaced the Athenian democracy by an oligarchy.

He was the son of Stratonides. In 412 BC, he was sent out with two others in command of a fleet of 40 ships to the coast of Asia Minor. The troops encamped in the territory of Miletus. A battle ensued in which the Athenians were victorious. A Peloponnesian fleet having arrived soon after, the colleagues of Phrynichus were for risking an engagement, from which Phrynichus (wisely, as Thucydides thinks) dissuaded them. In 411, when proposals were made to the Athenians at the island of Samos on the part of Alcibiades (an Athenian), who offered to secure for them Persian aid if an oligarchy were established instead of a democracy, Phrynichus again offered some sagacious advice, pointing out the dangers into which such a course would plunge them, and expressing his belief that Alcibiades was not at heart more friendly to an oligarchy than to a democracy, and his doubts as to his power of executing his promises. Peisander and the other members of the Athenian oligarchical faction, however, slighted his advice, and sent a deputation to Athens. Phrynichus, fearing for his safety in case Alcibiades should be restored, sent a letter to Astyochus (a Spartan), informing him of the machinations of Alcibiades. Astyochus betrayed the communication to Tissaphernes (a Persian) and Alcibiades, and the latter complained to his friends in the Athenian armament of the treason of Phrynichus, and demanded that he should be put to death.

The 19th century historian Connop Thirlwall was at a loss to decide whether the conduct of Phrynichus upon this occasion was the result of a blind want of caution, or a bold and subtle artifice. He wrote again to Astyochus, offering to betray the Athenian armament into his hands, and before the letter of Alcibiades, to whom Astyochus again showed the letter of Phrynichus, who sent a fresh charge against Phrynichus, could reach the Athenians, Phrynichus warned the Athenians that the enemy were preparing to surprise their encampment. By these means he made it appear that the charges of Alcibiades were groundless, and preferred against him out of personal enmity. Soon afterwards Peisander, wishing to get Phrynichus out of the way, procured his recall. In the subsequent progress of the oligarchical intrigues, when the oligarchical faction found that the hopes held out to them by Alcibiades were groundless, and that they could get on better without him than with him, Phrynichus again joined them, and, in conjunction with Antiphon, Peisander, and Theramenes, took a prominent part in the revolution which issued in the establishment of the oligarchy of the Four Hundred. When, on the junction effected between Alcibiades and the Athenians at Samos, Theramenes and others counselled the oligarchs to make the best terms they could with their antagonists, Phrynichus was one of the foremost in opposing every thing of the kind, and with Antiphon and ten others was sent to Sparta to negotiate a peace. On his return he was assassinated in the agora by a young Athenian, who was assisted by an Argive. The former escaped, but the latter was seized and put to the torture. It appeared that the assassination was the result of a conspiracy among those opposed to the oligarchs, and the latter found it the most prudent plan not to pursue the investigation. Lycurgus gives a different account of his assassination.

References
 Retrieved from archive.org. 

Date of birth unknown
411 BC deaths
5th-century BC Athenians
Ancient Athenian generals
Athenians of the Peloponnesian War
Assassinated Greek people